In chemistry, an inorganic compound is typically a chemical compound that lacks carbon–hydrogen bonds, that is, a compound that is not an organic compound. The study of inorganic compounds is a subfield of chemistry known as inorganic chemistry.

Inorganic compounds comprise most of the Earth's crust, although the compositions of the deep mantle remain active areas of investigation.

Some simple  carbon compounds are often considered inorganic. Examples include the allotropes of carbon (graphite, diamond, buckminsterfullerene, etc.), carbon monoxide, carbon dioxide, carbides, and the following salts of inorganic anions: carbonates, cyanides, cyanates, and thiocyanates. Many of these are normal parts of mostly organic systems, including organisms; describing a chemical as inorganic does not necessarily mean that it does not occur within living things.

History 
Friedrich Wöhler's conversion of ammonium cyanate into urea in 1828 is often cited as the starting point of modern organic chemistry. In Wöhler's era, there was widespread belief that organic compounds were characterized by a vital spirit.  In the absence of vitalism, the distinction between inorganic and organic chemistry is merely semantic.

Modern usage 
The Inorganic Crystal Structure Database (ICSD) in its definition of "inorganic" carbon compounds, states that such compounds may contain either C-H or C-C bonds, but not both.
The book series Inorganic Syntheses does not define inorganic compounds. The majority of its content deals with metal complexes of organic ligands.
IUPAC does not offer a definition of "inorganic" or "inorganic compound" but does define inorganic polymer as "...skeletal structure that does not include carbon atoms."

See also 
 Inorganic compounds by element
 List of inorganic compounds
 List of named inorganic compounds
 Mineral acid

References